Video games are among the most popular hobbies of Iranian youth. There were about 23 million video game players in the country as of 2015. By 2021 this had increased to 32 million.

Economic sanctions against Iran have hampered Iranian video game developers and their participation in international trade. The sanctions prevent their licensing of major game engines. Among consumers, sanctions block use of major digital stores and limit access to credit cards.

History 
The first Iranian game console which was named as "Video Master" was released into market in 1976. Its production factory was situated in Isfahan. The next Iranian company in this field was called as "General Electronic kit", situated in Tehran, which in 1978 was producing a game console named as "TV Game".

Hanfa, was the first Iranian game studio, which was established in mid-90s. "Tank Hunter" was the name of its first game produced, and "Ali Baba" was the second one. The first 3D video game of Iran was named as "Payan-e Masumiat" and was produced by the Iranian game studio "Puya Arts".

Magazines 
The first Iranian magazine specialised in gaming, titled as "Bazi-e Rayaneh" was established in 2001, and was covering the news surrounding video games.

Donya ye Bazi 

Donya ye Bazi (دنیای بازی), also known as DBazi or Donya e Baz, was an Iranian Persian-language computer games magazine. Founded by editor-in-chief Babak Namazian in September 2005, the magazine was devoted to supporting Iranian game developers, reviewing PC and console games and covering game industry news. 

Initially, the 32-page issues were published monthly on size A4 paper. After the first 13 issues, the monthly edition was reduced to a 16-page spread printed on 31 x 43 cm paper. The magazine became a biweekly publication after the first 30 issues.

The magazine's website, dbazi.com, was established in 2009, making it the first Iranian gaming news website. 

Donya ye Bazi: Game Developing Edition was first published in March 2010. The 64-page publication covered game development and the game industry and was released every two months.

Donya ye Bazi ceased publication after September 2014.

See also 

 1979 Revolution: Black Friday

References

Further reading

External links 
Donya ye Bazi - Official website

 
Video game culture
Science and technology in Iran
Iranian culture
2005 establishments in Iran
2013 disestablishments in Iran
Biweekly magazines
Defunct magazines published in Iran
Monthly magazines published in Iran
Magazines established in 2005
Magazines disestablished in 2013
Magazines published in Tehran
Persian-language magazines
Video game magazines